Half the World may refer to:

 "Half the World" (Belinda Carlisle song)
 "Half the World" (Rush song)
 "Half the World", a song by Arcane Roots from Melancholia Hymns
 Half the World, a novel in the Shattered Sea series by Joe Abercrombie
 A nickname of city of isfahan